Neoliodidae is a family of oribatids in the order Oribatida. There are at least 4 genera and 50 described species in Neoliodidae.

Genera
 Neoliodes Berlese, 1888
 Platyliodes Berlese, 1916
 Poroliodes Grandjean, 1934
 Teleioliodes Grandjean, 1934

References

Further reading

 
 
 
 

Acariformes
Acari families